Goniofusus dupetitthouarsi is a species of sea snail, a marine gastropod mollusk in the family Fasciolariidae, the spindle snails, the tulip snails and their allies.

Description
The length of the shell attains 165 mm.

Distribution
This species occurs in the Pacific Ocean off California, USA.

References

 Kiener, L.-C., 1839-40 Genre Fusus. Volume 5. In: Species général et iconographie des coquilles vivantes
 Vermeij G.J. & Snyder M.A. (2018). Proposed genus-level classification of large species of Fusininae (Gastropoda, Fasciolariidae). Basteria. 82(4-6): 57-82

External links
 Kiener L.C. 1839-1842. Spécies général et iconographie des coquilles vivantes. Vol. 5. Famille des Canalifères. Première partie. Genres Cérite (Cerithium), Adanson, pp. 1-104, pl. 1-32 [pp. 1-32 (1841), 33-104 (1842); pl. 1-32 (1841)]; Pleurotome (Pleurotoma), Lamarck, pp. 1–84, pl. 1-27 [pp. 1–16 (1839), 17-84 (1840), pl. 1-27 (1839)]; Fuseau (Fusus), Lamarck, pp. 1–62, pl. 1-30, 17bis [pp. 1–62 (1840); pl. 2-7, 12, 15-17, 17bis, 22-23, 25 (1839); pl. 1, 8-11, 13-14, 18-21, 24, 26-30: (1840)]. Paris, Rousseau & J.B. Baillière
 Lesson A. (1842). Notes sur quelques coquilles marines rapportées de la Mer du Sud. Revue Zoologique par la Société Cuvierienne. 5: 102-104

dupetitthouarsi
Gastropods described in 1840